Francis Joseph "Frank" McDonald (21 September 1899 – 28 May 1962) was an Australian rules footballer who played with Essendon in the Victorian Football League (VFL).

Family
The son of John Thomas McDonald (1863-1929), and Margaret Mary McDonald (1860-1936), née O'Brien, Francis Joseph McDonald was born at Allendale, Victoria on 21 September 1899; and, although his birth was registered as "Simon McDonald", throughout his life he was always known as "Francis Joseph McDonald".

He married Ilma Magdalen Laffy (1900-1955) in 1926.

Football
A full-forward, McDonald averaged two goals a game in his three seasons at Essendon. Recruited from the Victorian Football Association (VFA) team Footscray, his first appearance for Essendon, in round 10 of the 1919 VFL season, was also the last of his brother Paddy's nine games for Essendon.

McDonald twice won Essendon's leading goalkicker award (now known as the Matthew Lloyd Medal). The first was in 1920, when he kicked 33 goals from only 11 games. This included a seven-goal haul against Geelong. He topped the goal-kicking again the following year, 1921, with 17 goals in 10 games.

He captain-coached Hamilton in 1922 and 1923. During the 1920s he also spent some time in charge of South Ballarat.

Death
He died (suddenly) at the Sacred Heart Hospital in Moreland Road, Coburg, on 28 May 1962.

Footnotes

References
 
 Maplestone, M., Flying Higher: History of the Essendon Football Club 1872–1996, Essendon Football Club, (Melbourne), 1996.

External links
 
 
 Frank McDonald, at The VFA Project.

1899 births
Australian rules footballers from Victoria (Australia)
Essendon Football Club players
Footscray Football Club (VFA) players
South Ballarat Football Club players
1962 deaths
People from Creswick, Victoria
Australian rules football coaches